Billeswar Devalaya (Assamese: বিল্বেশ্বৰ দেৱালয়) in Belsor, Nalbari, Assam is an ancient Hindu temple and is dedicated to Shiva. This temple is believed to have been built 500 years ago.  Buffalo sacrifice during Durga Puja is an age-old tradition and ritual in this temple.

References

Shiva temples in Assam
Hindu temples in Assam
Tourist attractions in Assam
15th-century Hindu temples